The Saint Mary's Gaels women's basketball team represents Saint Mary's College in Moraga, California, competing in the West Coast Conference of the NCAA. The team plays home games in the McKeon Pavilion. They compete in the West Coast Conference.

History
Saint Mary's began play in 1978. They moved to Division I play in 1987. They have won the WCC Tournament twice (1999, 2001) and the regular season title thrice (1989, 1990, 2001). They made it to the Second Round of the 2001 NCAA Tournament after beating Texas 68–64. They lost to Tennessee 92–75 in the ensuing Second Round. They made the WNIT in 2000, 2002, 2010, 2011, 2012, 2013, 2014, and 2015. As of the end of the 2021–22 season, the Gaels have an all-time record of 755–537. In 2022, the Gaels won the Women's Basketball Invitational tournament.

Postseason results

NCAA Division I

NAIA Division I
The Gaels made one appearance in the NAIA Division I women's basketball tournament, with a combined record of 0–1.

References

External links